Carandiru may refer to:

 Carandiru (film), 2003 Brazilian film
Estação Carandiru, the 1999 novel the above film is based on
 Carandiru (São Paulo Metro), station on Line 1 (Blue) of the São Paulo Metro
 Carandiru Penitentiary, former prison in São Paulo, Brazil
 Carandiru massacre, a 1992 slaying of 111 prisoners by military police

See also
 Candiru (disambiguation)